The 1929 Australian Championships was a tennis tournament that took place on outdoor Grass courts at the Memorial Drive, Adelaide, Australia from 19 January to 28 January. It was the 22nd edition of the Australian Championships (now known as the Australian Open), the 4th held in Adelaide, and the first Grand Slam tournament of the year. The singles titles were won by British Colin Gregory and Australian Daphne Akhurst.

Finals

Men's singles

 Colin Gregory defeated  Bob Schlesinger 6–2, 6–2, 5–7, 7–5

Women's singles

 Daphne Akhurst defeated  Louie Bickerton 6–1, 5–7, 6–2

Men's doubles

 Jack Crawford /  Harry Hopman defeated  Jack Cummings /  Gar Moon 6–1, 6–8, 4–6, 6–1, 6–3

Women's doubles

 Daphne Akhurst /  Louie Bickerton defeated  Sylvia Harper /  Meryl O'Hara Wood 6–2, 3–6, 6–2

Mixed doubles

 Daphne Akhurst /  Gar Moon defeated  Marjorie Cox /  Jack Crawford 6–0, 7–5

External links
 Australian Open official website

1929
1929 in Australian tennis
January 1929 sports events